Tales from the Crypt, sometimes titled HBO's Tales from the Crypt, is an American horror anthology television series that ran from June 10, 1989, to July 19, 1996, on the premium cable channel HBO for seven seasons with a total of 93 episodes. It was executive produced by Joel Silver, Richard Donner, Robert Zemeckis, Walter Hill and David Giler (the Crypt Partners). The first two seasons were produced by William Teitler. Beginning the show's third season, HBO and the Crypt Partners hired Gilbert Adler and A L Katz to take over the show. Adler and Katz ran Crypt through to its conclusion five seasons and 69 episodes later.

The show's title is based on the 1950s EC Comics series of the same name and most of the content originated in that comic or other EC Comics of the time (The Haunt of Fear, The Vault of Horror, Crime SuspenStories, Shock SuspenStories, and Two-Fisted Tales). The series is hosted by the Cryptkeeper, a wisecracking corpse performed by puppeteers and voiced by John Kassir.

Because it was aired on HBO, a premium cable television channel, Tales from the Crypt was allowed to have full freedom from censorship by network standards and practices. As a result, HBO allowed the series to include content that had not appeared in most television series up to that time, such as graphic violence, profanity, sexual activity, and nudity. The series is subsequently edited for such content when broadcast in syndication or on basic cable. While the series began production in the United States, in the last season's filming moved to the UK, resulting in episodes which revolved around British characters.

Premise

Each episode begins with a tracking shot leading to the front door of the decrepit mansion of the Cryptkeeper, the show's host. Once inside, the camera tilts down from the foyer to the hallways and stairways, finally descending into the basement. The Cryptkeeper then comes out from his coffin, cackling wildly; green slime pours down over the screen as the main title appears. The Cryptkeeper is depicted as an animated corpse, as opposed to the original comics in which he was a living human being. The wisecracking Cryptkeeper (performed by puppeteers such as Van Snowden, Mike Elizalde, Frank Charles Lutkus, Patty Maloney, David Arthur Nelson, Anton Rupprecht, Shaun Smith, David Stinnent, Mike Trcic, and Brock Winkless, and voiced by John Kassir) would then introduce the episode with intentionally stereotyped puns, e.g., his frequent greeting to viewers: "Hello, Boils and Ghouls" or "Hello, Kiddies". Each episode was self-contained, and was bookended by an outro sequence, again involving the Cryptkeeper. Comic book cover art was created by Mike Vosburg and Shawn McManus.

Spin-offs
The success of the series led Universal Pictures to make a three picture deal with the Crypt Partners to produce three Crypt-branded feature films.

Films
The first Crypt-branded feature was Tales From The Crypt Presents Demon Knight (1995). With a screenplay by Ethan Reiff, Cyrus Vorhis and Mark Bishop, Demon Knight became a commercial success. Three weeks before starting prep on Demon Knight's intended follow up - a psychological thriller called "Dead Easy" - Universal changed its mind, canceled "Dead Easy" and had the creative team make Tales from the Crypt Presents: Bordello of Blood instead.

The film Ritual (2002) was not produced as a Tales from the Crypt film, but is considered to be a third entry in the Tales series.

Tales from the Cryptkeeper

In 1993, a Saturday morning cartoon called Tales from the Cryptkeeper was spun off from the HBO series. Produced by the Canada-based Nelvana for ABC in the United States and YTV in Canada, the violence of the prime-time series was substantially toned down and the gore was omitted. Nelvana employed a child psychologist to review the scripts to ensure the episodes would be suitable for young viewers. The Cryptkeeper puppet was considered as the host for the series but it was ultimately decided that it might frighten youngsters, so instead an animated version was created; John Kassir reprised his role. Kassir later stated "Nelvana created a kinder, gentler personality for the children's Cryptkeeper, and it feels a little uncharacteristic at times,". In addition to the Cryptkeeper, EC Comics' mascots The Vaultkeeper and The Old Witch also made frequent appearances, often fighting with the Cryptkeeper for control of the show's hosting duties. The series lasted two seasons on ABC with a total of 26 episodes.

In 1999, the series was revived on CBS for an additional 13 episodes under the title New Tales from the Cryptkeeper.

Secrets of the Cryptkeeper's Haunted House

A kids' game show called Secrets of the Cryptkeeper's Haunted House was featured on CBS from 1996 to 1997. The Cryptkeeper (again voiced by John Kassir) was the announcer of the show (he would often break into the action with appropriate wisecracks), and contestants competed in physical challenges on a variety of elaborate haunted house sets at Universal Studios Florida. In addition to The Cryptkeeper, the series also showed off an original character named Digger the Skeleton (voiced by Danny Mann).

Radio series

In 2000, several Tales from the Crypt "radio shows" were recorded for Seeing Ear Theatre, an online subsidiary of The Sci-Fi Channel, and were offered free as streaming RealAudio files on their website, as well as for sale on Audible.com. Although 13 episodes were planned (with forthcoming episodes listed as "TBA"), only eight stories were recorded. Seven of the eight shows were released on CD in 2002 by Highbridge Audio ("This Trick'll Kill You" was omitted from the CD set).

Two-Fisted Tales
In 1991, the Fox television network aired a pilot for Two-Fisted Tales, a spin-off based on the 1950s EC action comics. When Fox passed on the pilot, Cryptkeeper segments were put down onto the three stories ("Yellow", "Showdown", and "King of the Road"), and HBO ran them as Tales from the Crypt episodes.

Perversions of Science

After the original series ended, a spin-off called Perversions of Science premiered in June 1997 on HBO, this time being based more on sci-fi instead of horror. The series was unsuccessful and lasted for a short run, ending only a month after it had begun airing. This iteration of the franchise featured a stylized female robot host in place of The Cryptkeeper.

Notable guest stars 
A variety of notable guests have starred in episodes of Tales from the Crypt. This includes Academy Award-winning actors and A-list celebrities.

Some of the most famous people to have starred in episodes are listed below.

 Anthony Michael Hall
 Arnold Schwarzenegger
 Bill Paxton
 Billy Zane
 Benicio Del Toro
 Bobcat Goldthwait
 Brad Pitt
 Brad Dourif
 Brad Garrett
 Brooke Shields
 Bruce McGill
 Bruno Kirby
 Carol Kane
 Catherine O'Hara
 Cheech Marin
 Christopher Reeve
 Corey Feldman
 Cynthia Gibb
 Dan Aykroyd
 Daniel Craig
 Demi Moore
 Don Rickles
 Ewan McGregor
 Hank Azaria
 Iggy Pop
 Isaac Hayes
 Jada Pinkett Smith
 Joe Pantoliano
 Joe Pesci
 John Astin
 John Lithgow
 John Stamos
 Jon Lovitz
 Jonathan Banks
 Judd Nelson
 Katey Sagal
 Ke Huy Quan
 Kirk Douglas
 Kyle MacLachlan
 Lance Henriksen
 Lea Thompson
 Lou Diamond Phillips
 Malcolm McDowell
 Martin Sheen
 Meat Loaf
 Michael J. Fox
 Natasha Richardson
 Patricia Arquette
 Priscilla Presley
 Rita Rudner
 Roger Daltrey
 R. Lee Ermey
 Robert Patrick
 Slash
 Steve Buscemi
 Steven Weber
 Ted Danson
 Teri Hatcher
 Tim Curry
 Tom Hanks
 Travis Tritt
 Wayne Newton
 Whoopi Goldberg
 William Hickey
 Vincent Spano

Albums

Soundtrack
In 1991, Big Screen Records released a soundtrack album featuring assorted music from the series. The album includes the theme music, suites from 11 episodes and an original song titled "Crypt Jam" performed by The Cryptkeeper (John Kassir). A music video for "Crypt Jam" was filmed and is available as an extra on the Region 1 Season 3 DVD.

Have Yourself a Scary Little Christmas
In 1994, a Christmas album, Have Yourself a Scary Little Christmas, was released by The Right Stuff, a subsidiary of Capitol Records. Most of the songs are spoofs of holiday standards performed by The Cryptkeeper, such as "Juggle Bills" (Jingle Bells), "We Wish You'd Bury the Missus" (We Wish You a Merry Christmas) and "Deck the Halls with Parts of Charlie" (Deck the Halls), with narration and a few original songs mixed in. The CD booklet includes a black and white reprint of the comic "And All Through the House".

Monsters of Metal
In 2000, Capitol Records released another album titled Tales from the Crypt: Monsters of Metal. This album is a compilation of horror-themed songs from popular heavy metal bands with wraparound narration by the Cryptkeeper (John Kassir).

Home media
Warner Home Video has released all seven seasons on DVD Region 1. The DVDs for the first three seasons feature all-new Cryptkeeper introductions and segments. No new segments were filmed for seasons 4–7. On June 6, 2017, all seven seasons were reissued in a box set entitled Tales From the Crypt: The Complete Series. A Region 2 version of the whole series was released by '84 Entertainment on June 4, 2010,

Until mid 2020, the series was also available through the streaming platform Vudu.

Reruns
Reruns aired on Fox from 1994 to 1995 under the name Primetime Tales From the Crypt; episodes also aired in 1994 in a late-night time slot. It aired late night on CBS in 1997–1998. It also aired on other channels, such as Syfy, Chiller, and Fearnet.

In the United Kingdom, the series aired Fridays on ITV. Sky1 Satellite and cable channel Horror Channel (then Zone Horror) aired the series in both late night and daytime slots. The daytime versions were billed as "cut"; however, they remained uncut.

Tales from the Crypt is not available on HBO streaming services HBO Go (discontinued), HBO Now, or HBO Max reportedly due to licensing issues.

Awards
Tales from the Crypt won the following awards:
 1991 Motion Picture Sound Editors' Golden Reel Award for Best Sound Editing – Television Half-Hour – ADR
 1992 Motion Picture Sound Editors' Golden Reel Award for Best Sound Editing – Television Episodic – Effects and Foley
 1993 Motion Picture Sound Editors' Golden Reel Award for Best Sound Editing – Television Episodic – Effects and Foley
 1994 American Cinema Editors' Eddie Award for Best Edited Half Hour Series for Television (for the episode "People Who Live in Brass Hearses")

Nominations
 1990 Emmy Award for Outstanding Guest Actor in a Drama Series (William Hickey in the episode "The Switch")
 1991 Young Artist Award for Best Young Actor in a Cable Special (Mike Simmrin in the episode "The Secret")
 1992 Casting Society of America's Artios Award for Best Casting for TV, Dramatic Episodic
 1994 Emmy Awards for Outstanding Individual Achievement in Makeup for a Series and Outstanding Lead Actor in a Drama Series (Kirk Douglas)
 1994 Emmy Awards for Outstanding Guest Actor in a Drama Series (Tim Curry in the episode "Death Of Some Salesman"), Outstanding Individual Achievement in Costume Design for a Series and Outstanding Individual Achievement in Makeup for a Series
 1994 Young Artist Award for Best Youth Actor Guest Starring in a Television Show (Raushan Hammond in the episode "People Who Live in Brass Hearses")
 1995 Emmy Award for Outstanding Individual Achievement in Costume Design for a Series
 1996 American Society of Cinematographers Award for Outstanding Achievement in Cinematography in Regular Series (for the episode "You Murderer")

Cancelled reboots

In July 2011, it was announced that Gilbert Adler, who produced the original series, was working with Andrew Cosby to develop a new Tales from the Crypt series. It was said to be a continuous story, rather than an anthology, and would also omit The Cryptkeeper. The series was unsuccessfully shopped to several major networks.

In January 2016, Entertainment Weekly reported that M. Night Shyamalan would helm a series reboot as part of TNT's new two-hour horror block. The network ordered a 10-episode season that was slated for fall 2017. The series was to keep the episodic anthology format, but without The Cryptkeeper. In June 2017, it was announced that TNT would not move forward with the series due to legal rights issues concerning the rights for the characters from Tales from the Crypt Holdings.

References

External links

 
 

1980s American horror television series
1989 American television series debuts
1990s American horror television series
1996 American television series endings
1980s American anthology television series
1990s American anthology television series
American television shows featuring puppetry
English-language television shows
Fox late-night programming
HBO original programming
Television series by 20th Century Fox Television
Television series by Warner Bros. Television Studios
Tales from the Crypt
Television shows based on comics
Television shows filmed in the United Kingdom